Samantha Kate Dixon  is a British politician of the Labour Party who serves as Member of Parliament (MP) for the City of Chester, winning the seat in the 2022 City of Chester by-election. Between 2015 and 2019, Dixon was the leader of Cheshire West and Chester Council, the first woman to hold this position.

Early life
Dixon was born in Reading, Berkshire and has lived in Chester since the age of four, in areas including Hoole and Upton-by-Chester, and attended Christleton High School. She has a BA (1987) in English literature (British and Commonwealth) from the University of Sheffield, and worked for Sotheby's as a senior press officer from 1989 to 1997.

Political career

Council career
Dixon was first elected to Cheshire West and Chester Council in the 2011 council election, representing the Chester City and the Garden Quarter ward. In 2015, she became the first woman leader of the council. 

She was leader of her party group until the 2019 elections, when Labour lost overall control of the council. After resigning as council leader, Dixon remained a councillor for Chester City and The Garden Quarter ward.

Parliamentary career
On 30 October 2022, Dixon was announced as the Labour candidate for the City of Chester by-election. The by-election was triggered after the resignation of incumbent Labour MP Chris Matheson. One of her campaign pledges was to make the historic Chester Rows a World Heritage Site.

The by-election itself saw nine candidates, with 28,541 votes in total and a turnout of 41.2% of the local electorate. Dixon won with 60.8% of the vote, 17,309 votes, and a majority of 10,974. After her victory she said she would "fight Chester's corner" in Westminster.

She was sworn into the House of Commons on 5 December, and was welcomed to Parliament on 7 December by Keir Starmer and Labour MPs.

Personal life
Dixon is married to Nicholas and has three children. She enjoys knitting and learned how to knit socks during the COVID-19 lockdown.

Honours
Dixon was appointed a Member of the Order of the British Empire (MBE) in the 2022 Birthday Honours "for political service".

References

External links

Living people
21st-century English women politicians
Alumni of the University of Sheffield
Councillors in Cheshire
Female members of the Parliament of the United Kingdom for English constituencies
Labour Party (UK) MPs for English constituencies
Members of the Order of the British Empire
People educated at Christleton High School
People from Cheshire West and Chester
Sotheby's people
UK MPs 2019–present
Women councillors in England
Year of birth missing (living people)
Labour Party (UK) councillors
Leaders of local authorities of England